Josette Hébert-Coëffin (16 December 1906 Rouen – 3 June 1973 Neuilly-sur-Seine) was a French sculptor, medallist and a recipient of a 1937 Guggenheim Fellowship.

Early life and education 
Hébert-Coëffin was born on 16 December 1906 in Rouen, France. She studied at the École supérieure d'art et design Le Havre-Rouen under the direction of Victorien Lelong and earned first prize in sculpture and architecture at age 16 in 1922. She was later a student of Robert Wlérick and Charles Despiau in Paris. She later studied under Richard Dufour and worked in Alphonse Guilloux's studio.

Career
In 1927, Hébert-Coëffin exhibited two busts, Beethoven and Resignation, at the Salon des artistes francais. In 1937, she received a Guggenheim Fellowship and created models for the manufacture nationale de Sèvres. She also won gold medals at the 1937 World's Fair and the société d'encouragement pour l'industrie. She was elected to the académie des sciences, belles-lettres et arts de Rouen the following year as the third female member after Colette Yver and Louise Lefrançois-Pillion. In 1939, she showed her work at the Salon des Arts Décoratifs. Between 1938 and 1947, she worked under Maurice Gensoli. Much of her work was destroyed during bombings that devastated the Manufacture nationale de Sèvres in March 1942. At this time, she began developing skills in chamotte (stoneware chamotte), as she found it suitable for depicting goat hair, hornbills, kiwis, and feathers. She drew much of her inspiration from fauna. In 1948, she painted La Biche et son faon for President Vincent Auriol and in 1950 illustrated the book Chats des villes et chants des chats by Yahne Lambray and Renée Herrmann.

Hébert-Coëffin spent time at the Monnaie de Paris learning to become a medallist. Throughout her career, she made nearly 300 medals, including one for René Coty. She was the first woman to be commissioned to create a medal for a head of state since the time of François the 1st She also created a medal for Charles de Gaulle. In 1968, she presented de Gaulle with a medal in honor of the Winter Olympics. The medal was later awarded to the French national team. Jean Cocteau requested her specifically for the creation of his medal after seeing her drawings of cats.

Personal life
Hébert-Coëffin was married to industrialist and aviator Charles Coëffin. She died on 3 June 1973 in Paris and is buried next to her husband in Pont-Audemer's Saint-Germain Cemetery. She is surrounded by a grand-duc, her last unfinished work.

Selected works

Sculptures 
 Jean Tambareau, bust in bronze
 Henri Gadeau de Kerville (1936), bust in bronze - Musée des Beaux-Arts de Rouen, Rouen, France
 Coupe aux Boeufs de Hongrie (1940), bronze
 Virgin and Child, known as Madonna statuette - Sainte-Foy Church, Lacalm, France
 Bas-relief (1947) - Hôtel des Postes, Rouen, France
 The doe and her fawn (1948)
 Our Lady of Prudence (1958), statue, on the side of the route nationale 13 in Pacy-sur-Eure, France.
 Saint Vincent de Paul, bas-relief - Collégiale Notre-Dame d'Écouis, Écouis, France
 Monument to Tristan Bernard - Place Tristan Bernard, Paris, France
 Bust of Tristan Bernard -  Comédie-Française. Commissioned by Comédie-Française, donated by Bernard's family, and displayed in the foyer.
 René Tamarelle, bronze medallion - Square René-Tamarelle, Bihorel, France
 William the Conqueror stele - Saint-Valery-sur-Somme, France
 Commemorative plaque of the Mora (1966) bronze plaque - Barfleur, France
 Plaque du Général Giraud (1954) - Barentin (Seine-Maritime), France
 Monument in bronze for Jean Perrin - Jardin des Champs-Élysées, (opposite the Grand Palais), Paris, France
 Bust of Louis Ricard - Court of Appeals, Rouen, France
 Stele and bronze portrait of Charles de Gaulle - Place du Général-de-Gaulle 
 Bust of Etienne Louis Malus, plaster - Museum of the  École polytechnique

Medals 
 The Pont Saint-Jean (Bordeaux) (1965), bronze. Other version in silver plated bronze.
 French Republic. Ministère du travail. Caisse nationale de prévoyance (1975), bronze
 Sud-Ouest, bronze
 Marie Curie (1867–1934) (1967), bronze - Monnaie de Paris, Paris, France
 1968 Winter Olympics, Grenoble (1968), bronze
 Joan of Arc (1431–1456) (1971), bronze - Monnaie de Paris, Paris, France
 Philippe Boiry (1927–2014) (1965)
 Dean Denis Leroy (1973) - Rennes, France
 Memorial of the Natzweiler-Struthof concentration camp liberation

Paintings
 Napoleon III : study for the allegory of France, charcoal drawing - Musée Hébert, Paris, France
 Ophelia with Cornflowers, painting - Musée Hébert, Paris, France

Exhibitions

France

 1927: Salon des artistes français - Beethoven and Resignation, busts
 1927-1939: Salon des artistes rouennais
 1931: Salon des artistes français - bronze sculpture of the Société des artistes français
 1933: Salon d'automne
 1935: Salon des Indépendants. Acquired by the General Council of the Seine.
 1936: Salon des Indépendants - sparrow. Stolen during the exhibition.
 1936: Salon des arts ménagers - Le Toucan
 1936: Salon d’automne - Oiseaux
 1936: Exposition des Seize, Rouen  - aviation monument, Ministry of Air
 1938: Galerie L’Équipe - Abstract and Non-Objective Art exhibition
 1938: Petit Palais - 33rd Group of Artist de ce temps
 1938-1953: Salon des Tuileries
 1940: Salon d'automne
 1962: Musée Carnavalet - Medal of the SS France (1960)
 Unknown date: Château de Rambouillet

Austria
 1957: Kunsthistorisches Museum - Modern French Medallists exhibition

Brazil
 Ambassade de France au Brésil - Vase decorated with ram's head

Italy
 Villa Médicis

United Kingdom
 2006 (post-mortem): British Museum - Médaille des 1968 Winter Olympics Grenoble
 2019 (post-mortem): The Sladmore Gallery - Sculptures of Les Animaliers 1900–1950

United States
 1939: Solomon R. Guggenheim Foundation - Non-Objective Painting Collection. No. 7 and No. 8, oil on paper.
 1940: Solomon R. Guggenheim Foundation - Ten American Non-Objective Painters
 1951: National Gallery of Art - Medal Jean Cocteau

Awards 
 1934: Bouctot Prize (fine arts), Académie des sciences, belles-lettres et arts de Rouen
 1936: Silver Plaquette, 21st annual competition organized by the Société d'encouragement à l'art et à l'industrie
 1937: Gold medal, Exposition Internationale des Arts et Techniques dans la Vie Moderne
 1937: Guggenheim Fellowship
 1938: Membership, Académie des sciences, belles-lettres et arts de Rouen
 Officer of the National Order of the Legion of Honour
 Knight of the National Order of Merit 
 Knight of the Ordre des Arts et des Lettres
 Knight of the Order of Cultural Merit (Monaco)

Further reading 
 Jean-Jacques Pinel, Histoire de 140 familles. Témoignages de 70 descendants. 2 siècles d'industrie à Rouen, Rouen, 2008
 Emmanuel Bénézit, Dictionnaire des peintres, sculpteurs, dessinateurs et graveurs, tome 3, 1976 et 1999, page 91
 Edward Horswell, Sculptures of Les Animaliers 1900 – 1950, Scala Arts and Heritage Publishers Ltd, Londres, 2019 (exposition Sculptures of Les Animaliers 1900 – 1950, Sladmore gallery Londres, 2019)
 Pierre-Maurice Lefebvre, Hommage à Josette Hébert-Coëffin (1907–1973), Précis analytique des travaux de l'Académie des sciences, belles-lettres et arts de Rouen année 1973, Fécamp, Édition L. Durand & Fils, 1975
 Josette Hébert-Coëffin sculpteur et médailleur, Éditions Sciaky, Paris, 1974
 Robert Rey, Josette Hébert-Coëffin, Édition les Gémeaux, Paris, 1954
 Visite à l’atelier de Mme Josette Coeffin, sculpteur à la Manufacture de Sèvres, UNF. Union nationale des femmes : revue des électrices, Paris, 1 février 1946

References

External links
 
 Website Getty Images – Josette Coeffin sculpting, Photo taken Jan 1st 1930

1906 births
1973 deaths
20th-century French women artists
French sculptors
French women sculptors
Artists from Rouen